Antoine Blondin (11 April 1922 –  7 June 1991) was a French writer.

He belonged to the literary group called the Hussards. He was also a sports columnist in L'Équipe. Blondin also wrote under the name Tenorio.

Biography
Blondin was the son of a poet, Germaine Blondin, whose name he took, and of a printer's proof-reader. He earned a degree in philosophy the Sorbonne after studying at the Lycée Louis-le-Grand in Paris and the Lycée Pierre Corneille in Rouen. 
He became very close to Roland Laudenbach during World War II.
He was sent to Germany in 1942 for compulsory war work during the German occupation of World War II. The experience inspired his first novel, L'Europe buissonnière, which appeared in 1949. It won the Prix des Deux Magots, named after a literary café in Paris, and brought him the friendship of authors such as Marcel Aymé and Roger Nimier and the philosopher, Jean-Paul Sartre. In 1953, the young critic Bernard Frank dubbed the novelists Roger Nimier, Jacques Laurent, and Blondin as "les Hussards," a title which stuck. The Hussars were characterized by their shared right-wing literary heritage, youthful irreverence towards leftist intellectuals, and a commitment to "art for art's sake." Blondin's right-wing leanings did not, however, prevent a friendship with the socialist François Mitterrand, for whom he later came to vote.

His next novels, Les Enfants du bon Dieu and L'Humeur vagabonde confirmed a distinctive style which critics placed between Stendhal and Jules Renard.  Turns of phrase such as "After the second world war, the trains started moving again. I profited from that by leaving my wife and children" and "I have stayed very thin, and so has my body of work," are exemplary of Blondin's affinity for wordplay and humor. The themes of friendship, bohemianism, and the historical shock of World War II also held a prominent place in his fiction. After publishing the well-received novel Un Singe en hiver, Blondin remained an active journalist, but the death of his best friend Roger Nimier prompted him to largely abandon writing fiction for over a decade. Nonetheless, he won the 1977 Prix Goncourt de la Nouvelle for the short story collection Quat'saisons.

Blondin wrote press columns supporting the right in politics. He was a monarchist and wrote for monarchist publications such as Aspects de la France, La Nation Française and Rivarol. Although he was associated with Action Française intellectuals and the Maurrassian right during the beginning of his career, he distanced himself from politics later in his life. He also wrote sports features for L'Équipe, for which he covered 27 editions of the Tour de France and seven Olympic Games. The Tour de France winner, Bernard Hinault, said:

He never interviews anybody but just records his impressions of what he's seen and what he feels. Sometimes René Fallet was with him. They both love the Tour and, in simple language, they turn it into a modern epic, a troubador's song, a crusade, as they describe its beauty. The most banal event becomes significant to Blondin; he has only to see it and write about it. He raised the status of the Tour by giving it his own cachet; it became a myth to be renewed every year. No matter how predictable the race, he could maintain the interest in it.

Blondin was a bon vivant known for heavy drinking in the Parisian district of Saint-Germain-des-Prés, playing at bull-fighting with passing cars and racking up numerous arrests for drunkenness. He chronicled this aspect of his life in the autofictional novel, Monsieur Jadis ou L'École du Soir. He was frequently pursued for unpaid taxes. Pierre Chany said:

He really did owe a lot and, frankly, his situation was becoming serious; we even wondered if he wasn't going to prison. Faced with that, his friends called Maître Bertrand to the rescue. Bertrand managed to organise a summit meeting with the general inspector of taxes - the highest man in his profession, the equivalent of a minister. Full of good will, this man said:

"Alors, M. Blondin, I understand that you want to come to terms..."

"Let's come to terms!" Antoine said coldly.

"How much would you be able to put into your account?"

"A tear, monsieur..." Naturally, the man threw him out. It was poor Françoise who had to make another interview to sort it out.

A literary prize, for the best sports article, is awarded in his name.

References

1922 births
1991 deaths
Writers from Paris
People affiliated with Action Française
Cycling journalists
Tour de France journalists
Cycling in France
Prix des Deux Magots winners
Prix Goncourt de la nouvelle recipients
Prix Interallié winners
Lycée Pierre-Corneille alumni
Lycée Louis-le-Grand alumni
Burials at Père Lachaise Cemetery
20th-century French novelists
20th-century French male writers
French male novelists
French male non-fiction writers
20th-century French journalists
French World War II forced labourers